Biaraq (also Romanized as Bī‘araq; also known as Bī‘areh) is a village in Ani Rural District, in the Central District of Germi County, Ardabil Province, Iran. At the 2006 census, its population was 44, in 8 families.

References 

Towns and villages in Germi County